Orig (stylize as ORIG and short for "Original") is the ninth album of singer/songwriter/actor/host Janno Gibbs. This 11-track, all-original album was produced and released by GMA Records in March, 2009. The album is available on CD and on a limited edition secure digital album format, actually a mini-SD with 2GB capacity.

Track listing

Personnel
 Producers: Kedy Sanchez & Janno Gibbs
 Executive producer: Buddy C. Medina
 Marketing: Rene A. Salta
 A&R supervision: Kedy Sanchez
 Production coordination: Louella Tiongson

Recorded and mixed at
 GMA Network Recording Studios
 Sound engineer: Oyet San Diego
 Additional engineering: Edwin Dimaano, Archie Gaba
 Asiatec Pink Noise Recording Studios
 Sound engineer: Dominic Benedicto
 Additional engineering: Nikki Cunanan, Ramil Bahandi
 Draginlair Studios
 Sound engineers: Voltaire Orpiano, Raul Mitra

References

2009 albums
Soul albums
Janno Gibbs albums
GMA Music albums